Vormsi Cemetery is a cemetery in Vormsi Island in Lääne County, Estonia.

The cemetery is located next to Vormsi St. Olav's Church. The cemetery's older part consists limestone and sandstone wheel crosses. In total, there are over 330 wheel crosses.

Notable burials:
 Hans Pöhl, Estonian politician, by nationality Estonian Swedes

References

Cemeteries in Estonia
Vormsi Parish